is a Japanese model and actress associated with Flamme and BH Entertainment. In 2014, she debuted as a model, and in 2017, she began a concurrent modeling and acting career in South Korea. Notable film and television projects that Karata has starred in include Lock-On Love, Asako I & II, and Arthdal Chronicles.

Career

When Karata was in her second year of high school, she was scouted by an agency official at her workplace, where she had been a part-time employee at a farm theme park. She began her career as a model and first appeared in the music video for "Divine" by Girls' Generation. Afterwards, she made minor appearances in the television dramas Koi Naka and Cho Gentei Noryoku and became the image model for the Sony Financial Holdings commercials.

In 2017, Karata signed with BH Entertainment to manage her activities in South Korea. During this time, she also appeared in a commercial for LG and a music video for "Emptiness" by Naul. In 2018, Karata starred in Asako I & II, for which she won the Best New Actor Award at the Yokohama Film Festival.

On January 23, 2020, Shūkan Bunshun revealed that Karata had been involved in an extramarital affair with actor Masahiro Higashide, her co-star on Asako I & II, since 2017 even while his wife was pregnant with their third child. In response, she dropped out of the television series Prayers in the Emergency Room. Episodes 5 and 6 of 100-moji Idea Drama o Shita!, which she had co-written and starred in, was removed from broadcast. The episodes had been about a newcomer actress being involved in an extramarital affair and had included Higashide's name as Karata's character's friend.

Filmography

Television

Film

Awards and accolades

References

External links
 Erika Karata at FLaMme 
 

1997 births
21st-century Japanese actresses
Japanese expatriates in South Korea
Japanese female models
Japanese film actresses
Japanese television actresses
Actors from Chiba Prefecture
People from Kimitsu
Living people